Daniel James Boxall (born 24 August 1977) is an English former professional footballer who played as a right back for Brentford, Bristol Rovers, Oldham Athletic and Crystal Palace. After two seasons in Ireland with Dublin City, he returned to England in 2006 to play non-League football and retired in 2008.

Club career 
A right back, Boxall began his senior career at First Division club Crystal Palace and made 8 appearances during the 1995–96 and 1996–97 seasons. He made two appearances during Palace's single-season stay in the Premier League and spent most of 1997–98 on loan at Second Division club Oldham Athletic. Having been hampered by an anterior cruciate ligament injury injury suffered during his time at Selhurst Park, Boxall was released by Crystal Palace in June 1998 and joined newly-relegated Third Division club Brentford on a free transfer. He made 46 appearances and scored one goal during the Bees' Third Division-title winning 1998–99 season. A second anterior cruciate ligament injury suffered in February 2000 kept Boxall out of match play until March 2002 and he made a number of late-2001–02 season appearances. He was released after Brentford's Second Division play-off Final defeat and played the 2002–03 and 2003–04 seasons with Third Division club Bristol Rovers. After putting off a decision to retire, Boxall played his subsequent career in the League of Ireland and English non-League football, before retiring due to injury in 2008.

International career
Owing to an irish grandmother from Wexford, Boxall qualified to represent the Republic of Ireland at international level and he won eight U21 caps in 1998 and 1999.

Personal life 
Boxall was born at Mayday Hospital and attended Holy Trinity Church of England Junior School and Stanley Park High School in Wallington. He has four older brothers and an older sister. Boxall has worked as a male model and has run cleaning, construction and physiotherapy businesses. As of 2020, he was director of cleaning and property business Adept London.

Trivia
Boxall was hired as a body double for Kuno Becker's legs in close-up dribbling sequences in the 2005 film Goal!.

Honours 
Brentford
 Football League Third Division: 1998–99

Career statistics

References

External links

Danny Boxall at fai.ie
Danny Boxall at premierleague.com

1977 births
Living people
Footballers from Croydon
English footballers
Republic of Ireland under-21 international footballers
Crystal Palace F.C. players
Oldham Athletic A.F.C. players
Brentford F.C. players
Bristol Rovers F.C. players
Whyteleafe F.C. players
Croydon Athletic F.C. players
English Football League players
Premier League players
English male models
Association football fullbacks
Hampton & Richmond Borough F.C. players